Cyclopic is a former mining village in Mohave County, Arizona, United States.

References

Ghost towns in Arizona
Former populated places in Mohave County, Arizona